The Political Machine 2008 is a government simulation game from Stardock and the second game in The Political Machine series, in which the player leads a campaign to elect the President of the United States. The player accomplishes this goal by traveling from state to state and engaging in a variety of activities to either raise money or raise poll numbers. It is the sequel to The Political Machine released in 2004. The Political Machine 2008 features new candidates such as Barack Obama and John McCain. The game focuses on much more current issues and the constant need for money.

The game features three more scenarios, election in the American Civil War, an election taking place in an alternative European Union, and an alien world.

The developers said that they would add new content into the game before November 4 (the election) and update the issues as they changed in importance. New candidates were also planned once minor bugs were ironed out.

Presidential candidates

Democrats
Fmr. President Bill Clinton (D-AR)
Secretary of State Hillary Clinton (D-NY)
Fmr. Sen. John Edwards (D-NC)
Fmr. Vice President Al Gore (D-TN)
Sen. John Kerry (D-MA)
Sen. Barack Obama (D-IL)
Gov. Bill Richardson (D-NM)
Fmr. President Jimmy Carter (D-GA) - unlock
Fmr. President John F Kennedy (D-MA) - unlock
Fmr. President Lyndon B. Johnson (D-TX) - unlock
Fmr. President Woodrow Wilson (D-NJ) - unlock
Fmr. President Thomas Jefferson (DR-VA) - unlock
Fmr. Senator Mike Gravel (D-AK) - download
Rep. Dennis Kucinich (D-OH) - download
Sen. Joe Biden (D-DE) - download

Republicans

Lord Kona (fictional)
President George W. Bush (R-TX)
Vice President Dick Cheney (R-WY)
Fmr. New York City Mayor Rudy Giuliani (R-NY)
Sen. John McCain (R-AZ)
Rep. Ron Paul (R-TX)
Fmr. Governor Mitt Romney (R-MA)
Fmr. President Ulysses S. Grant (R-OH) - unlock
Fmr. President Richard Nixon (R-CA) - unlock
Fmr. President Ronald Reagan (R-CA) - unlock
Fmr. President Theodore Roosevelt (R-NY) - unlock
Fmr. President George Washington (VA) -unlock
Fmr. President Abraham Lincoln (R-IL) - unlock
Fmr. Governor  Mike Huckabee (R-AR) - download
Governor Sarah Palin (R-AK) - download

It is not possible to run as a third-party or independent candidate.

Reception

The game received "average" reviews according to video game review aggregator Metacritic. IT Reviews said that "the gameplay is sufficiently engrossing and varied to keep your interest". GameSpy called it "a really solid 'beer & pretzels' strategy game". 1UP.com complained that "with more focus on the real-world conflicts and unpredictable events that plague campaigns, running for office might be a bit less tiresome".

References

External links
 
 

Satirical video games
Political satire video games
2008 video games
Video games based on real people
Cultural depictions of presidents of the United States
Cultural depictions of politicians
Cultural depictions of George Washington
Cultural depictions of Abraham Lincoln
Cultural depictions of Thomas Jefferson
Cultural depictions of Ulysses S. Grant
Cultural depictions of Bill Clinton
Cultural depictions of Hillary Clinton
Cultural depictions of Joe Biden
Cultural depictions of John F. Kennedy
Cultural depictions of Lyndon B. Johnson
Cultural depictions of Jimmy Carter
Cultural depictions of Theodore Roosevelt
Cultural depictions of Al Gore
Cultural depictions of Woodrow Wilson
Cultural depictions of George W. Bush
Cultural depictions of Richard Nixon
Cultural depictions of Ronald Reagan
Cultural depictions of Sarah Palin
Government simulation video games
Multiplayer and single-player video games
Stardock games
Ubisoft games
2008 United States presidential election in popular culture
Video games developed in the United States
Windows games
Windows-only games
Video games set in the United States